Tanner Dieterich (born May 4, 1998) is an American soccer player who plays as a midfielder.

Career

Youth
After time with various youth teams in his native Tennessee, Dieterich spent time with both the Real Salt Lake academy in Arizona, as well as the IMG Academy in Florida.

College and amateur
Dieterich played four years of college soccer at Clemson University between 2016 and 2019, making 75 appearances, scoring 9 goals and tallying 13 assists. He captained the Tigers for three seasons and in 2019 he was named Second Team All-ACC.

While playing at college, Dieterich appeared for NPSL side Nashville FC in 2016, and in the USL PDL for Nashville SC U23.

Professional
On January 9, 2020, Dieterich was selected 28th overall in the 2020 MLS SuperDraft by Nashville SC. On February 25, 2020, Dieterich signed with Nasville.

On August 6, 2020, Dieterich was loaned out to USL League One side Charlotte Independence for the remainder of the season. He made his professional debut on August 15, 2020, appearing as a 67th-minute substitute in a 1–0 loss to Greenville Triumph.

Dieterich's contract with Nashville expired following the 2020 season.

References

External links
Clemson Tigers bio

1998 births
Living people
American soccer players
Soccer players from Tennessee
Sportspeople from Nashville, Tennessee
Association football midfielders
Clemson Tigers men's soccer players
Nashville SC players
Chattanooga Red Wolves SC players
USL League One players
USL League Two players
Nashville SC draft picks
National Premier Soccer League players
United States men's youth international soccer players